CEPCI may refer to:

Cashew Export Promotion Council of India
Chemical Engineering Plant Cost Index